The 1980 Cal State Hayward Pioneers football team represented California State University, Hayward—now known as California State University, East Bay—as a member of the Far Western Conference (FWC) during the 1980 NCAA Division II football season. Led by sixth-year head coach Tim Tierney, Cal State Hayward compiled an overall record of 6–4 with a mark of 3–2 in conference play, tying for second place in the FWC. The team outscored its opponents 167 to 159 for the season. The Pioneers played home games at Pioneer Stadium in Hayward, California.

Schedule

References

Cal State Hayward
Cal State Hayward Pioneers football seasons
Cal State Hayward Pioneers football